CKBG-FM is a low-power FM Soft AC radio station licensed to Amherstburg, Ontario, soon to commence broadcasting on 107.9 MHz, owned by Martyn Adler's Amherstburg Broadcasting Corporation.  The station had applied for a licensed to broadcast in 2021, but was initially denied.  However, the station's identical application in 2022 was accepted by the CRTC.

References

External links
Official website

Radio stations established in 2022
KBG
2022 establishments in Ontario
KBG-FM

Amherstburg, Ontario